Ural Technological College is a higher education institute (a branch of National Research Nuclear University) in Zarechny near Yekaterinburg, Sverdlovsk Oblast, Russian Federation.

History 

The institution was established in 1956 as a branch of Sverdlovsk Power Construction technicum to provide specialists for the construction of Beloyarsk Nuclear Power Station. Over the years the educational focus transformed together with the needs of the power station and local industries.

In 1990 it was renamed to Beloyarsk Polytechnic College and started to provide education services for a broader range of disciplines.

It was renamed to its current name Ural Technological College in year 2004 and became a branch of National Research Nuclear University in 2009.

External links

1956 establishments in Russia
Educational institutions established in 1956
Universities in Sverdlovsk Oblast
Moscow Engineering Physics Institute